The European Scrutiny Committee is a select committee of the House of Commons in the Parliament of the United Kingdom. Following Britain's withdrawal from the European Union in January 2020 and the end of the transition period on 31 December 2020, the Committee continues to "monitor the legal and/or political importance of new EU legislation and policy and assess their potential implications for the UK. It may also scrutinise the implementation of the Withdrawal Agreement, the Protocol on Northern Ireland and the UK/EU Trade & Cooperation Agreement."

Membership
The current membership is as follows:

Changes 2019-present
Occasionally, the House of Commons orders changes to be made in terms of membership of select committees, as proposed by the Committee of Selection. Such changes from 2019 onwards are shown below.

2017-2019 Parliament
Members of the committee were announced on 30 October 2017.

Changes 2017-2019

2015-2017 Parliament
Members of the committee were announced on 15 July 2015.

Changes 2015-2017

2010-2015 Parliament
Members of the committee were announced on 26 July 2010.

Changes 2010-2015

See also
List of Committees of the United Kingdom Parliament
European Affairs Committee (French Assembly)

References

External links
Records of the European Scrutiny Committee are kept at the Parliamentary Archives
European Scrutiny Committee

Select Committees of the British House of Commons
United Kingdom and the European Union